John Reginald Neville, CM, OBE (2 May 1925 – 19 November 2011) was an English theatre and film actor who moved to Canada in 1972. He enjoyed a resurgence of international attention in the 1980s as a result of his starring role in Terry Gilliam's The Adventures of Baron Munchausen (1988).

Early life and education
Neville was born in Willesden, London, the son of Mabel Lillian (née Fry) and Reginald Daniel Neville, a lorry driver. He was educated at Willesden and Chiswick County Schools for Boys and, after service in the Royal Navy during the Second World War, trained as an actor at the Royal Academy of Dramatic Art before starting his professional career as a member of the Trent Players.

Career

United Kingdom
Neville was a West End star of the 1950s, hailed as "one of the most potent classical actors of the Richard Burton–Peter O'Toole generation". A leading member of London's Old Vic Company, he played many classical leading roles, including Romeo in Shakespeare's Romeo and Juliet (a role he repeated on American television for the anthology series Producers' Showcase), and an acclaimed Richard in Richard II, with Virginia McKenna as Queen Anne. He also alternated with Richard Burton the parts of Othello and Iago in Othello. He was a frequent performer at the Bristol Old Vic. He received good reviews in the musical adaptation of Lolita, called Lolita, My Love, which closed in Boston.

Known for his classical good looks and mellifluous voice, the young Neville was regularly described as the young John Gielgud's natural successor. For a while, he took over the leading role of Nestor Le Fripé from Keith Michell in the original West End production of the musical Irma La Douce, with Elizabeth Seal as Irma. He returned to the London stage for a brief period in 1963, playing the title role in Alfie by Bill Naughton, but by then his theatrical commitment lay outside London.

In 1961, his weekly pay declining from £200 to £50, he joined the Nottingham Playhouse, becoming joint artistic director with Frank Dunlop and Peter Ustinov when the current Playhouse opened in 1963. It became one of Britain's leading regional repertory theatres. Though Dunlop and Ustinov soon left, Neville remained at the theatre until 1967, when he resigned over funding disputes with the local authority and the Arts Council.

Neville starred as the Duke of Marlborough in the BBC2 serial The First Churchills (1969), a major television role which also maintained his international profile when the show was broadcast as the very first Masterpiece Theatre series in the United States in 1971.

Canada
With his family, he left Britain for Canada in 1972, becoming a citizen there. He devoted his later career to the Canadian theatre. He took up the post of artistic director at the Citadel Theatre in Edmonton, Alberta (1973–78), and later took similar positions with the Neptune Theatre in Halifax, Nova Scotia (1978–83) and other Canadian theatre companies, including as artistic director of the Stratford Festival of Canada from 1985 to 1989, while continuing his acting career. On top of his artistic decisions, Neville helped eliminate the Neptune's deficit with canny promotions, such as giving free tickets to the local taxi drivers and their families, correctly anticipating that recipients would enthusiastically discuss the theatre with passengers and tourists.

Director Terry Gilliam cast him as the lead in The Adventures of Baron Munchausen (1988). In the film, Neville plays the character at three different stages of his life; in his 30s, his 50s and his 70s. From 1995 to 1998, Neville had a prominent recurring role in The X-Files television series as The Well Manicured Man, and in 1998, he reprised the role in the feature film The X-Files. Although he made numerous other television appearances and occasional film roles, the main focus of Neville's career was always on the theatre.

In his later years, Neville had numerous cameo appearances in films, including primate of the Anglican Church in Australia in The Man Who Sued God and an admiral in the Earth Space Navy in The Fifth Element. He had a small role as Terrence in David Cronenberg's Spider (2002). Around the same time, he appeared with Vanessa Redgrave in the film adaptation of Crime and Punishment (also 2002).

In 2003, Neville performed a stage reading of John Milton's Samson Agonistes, with Claire Bloom at Bryn Mawr College at the behest of poet Karl Kirchwey. He appeared in an episode of the soap opera Train 48 (2005) as the grandfather of Zach Eisler, who was played by his grandson Joe Dinicol.

He was appointed a Member of the Order of Canada in 2006.

Death
According to publicists at Canada's Stratford Shakespeare Festival, Neville died "peacefully surrounded by family" on 19 November 2011, aged 86. Neville suffered from Alzheimer's disease in his later years. He was survived by his wife Caroline (née Hooper) and their six children.

Select filmography

 Oscar Wilde (1960) – Lord Alfred Douglas
 Mr. Topaze (1961) – Roger de Bersac
 Billy Budd (1962) – Julian Radcliffe, Second Lieutenant
 Unearthly Stranger (1963) – Dr. Mark Davidson
 A Study in Terror (1965) – Sherlock Holmes
 Shaggy Dog (1968, TV Series) – Wilkie
 The Adventures of Gerard (1970) – Duke of Wellington
 Boswell's Life of Johnson (1971, TV Movie) – David Garrick
 The Rivals of Sherlock Holmes (1973, TV Series) – Dr Thorndyke
 Reil (1979, TV Movie) – General Wolseley
 The Adventures of Baron Munchausen (1988) – Hieronymus Karl Frederick Baron von Munchausen
 Journey to the Center of the Earth (1993, TV Movie) – Dr. Cecil Chambers
 Star Trek - The Next Generation (1993, Season six, Episode 26: "Descent") – Sir Isaac Newton
 Dieppe (1993, TV Movie) – Gen. Sir Alan Brooke
 Stark (1993, TV Mini-Series) – De Quincy
 Baby's Day Out (1994) – Mr. Andrews
 The Road to Wellville (1994) – Endymion Hart-Jones
 Little Women (1994) – Mr. Laurence
 Dangerous Minds (1995) – Waiter
 The Song Spinner (1995, TV Movie) – Frilo, the Magnificent
 Sabotage (1996) - Prof. Follenfant
 Adventures of Smoke Bellew (1996, TV Mini-Series) – Dwight Sanderson
 Swann (1996) – Cruzzi
 High School High (1996) – Thaddeus Clark
 The Fifth Element (1997) – General Staedert
 Regeneration (1997) – Dr. Yealland
 Time to Say Goodbye? (1997) – Michigan Judge
 Dinner at Fred's (1997) – Uncle Henrick
 My Teacher Ate My Homework (1997) – Shopkeeper
 Johnny 2.0 (1997, TV Movie) – Bosch
 Goodbye Lover (1998) – Bradley
 The X-Files (1998) – The Well-Manicured Man
 Urban Legend (1998) – Dean Adams
 Emily of New Moon (1998–2000, TV Series) – Uncle Malcolm
 Water Damage (1999) – Jock Beale
 Sunshine (1999) – Gustave Sors
 The Duke (1999) – the Duke
 Bonhoeffer: Agent of Grace (2000) – Bishop George Bell
 Custody of the Heart (2000, TV Movie) – Judge H. Chadwick
 Harvard Man (2001) – Dr. Reese
 The Stork Derby (2002, TV Movie) – Mr. Cunningham
 Trudeau (2002, TV Movie) – British High Commissioner
 Time of the Wolf (2002) – Preacher
 Spider (2002) – Terrence
 Crime and Punishment (2002) – Marmeladov, Sonia's alcoholic father
 Between Strangers (2002) – Orson Stewart
 Escape from the Newsroom (2002, TV Movie) – George's Father
 Control Factor (2003, TV Movie) – Director
 Moving Malcolm (2003) – Malcolm Woodward
 Hollywood North (2003) – Henry Neville
 The Statement (2003) – Old Man
 Rolie Polie Olie (2003) - Klanky Klaus (replacing Howard Gerome)
 White Knuckles (2004) – Narrator (voice)
 Separate Lies (2005) – Lord Rawston
 The Tragic Story of Nling'' (2006) - Donkey

References

External links

John Neville at The Canadian Encyclopedia

1925 births
2011 deaths
Alumni of RADA
Canadian artistic directors
English expatriates in Canada
English male film actors
English male Shakespearean actors
English male stage actors
English male television actors
Members of the Order of Canada
Officers of the Order of the British Empire
People educated at Willesden County Grammar School
People from Willesden
Royal Navy personnel of World War II